This is a list of compositions by Nikolai Medtner by genre.

Concertante 
 Piano Concerto No. 1 in C minor, Op. 33 (1914–18)
 Piano Concerto No. 2 in C minor, Op. 50 (1920–27)
 Piano Concerto No. 3 Ballade (Баллада) in E minor, Op. 60 (1940–43)

Chamber music 
 3 Nocturnes (Три ноктюрна) for violin and piano, Op. 16 (1904–08)
 Sonata No. 1 in B minor for violin and piano, Op. 21 (1904–10)
 2 Canzonas with Dances (Две канцоны с танцами; 2 Canzonen mit Tänzen) for violin and piano, Op. 43 (1922–24)
 Sonata No. 2 in G major for violin and piano, Op. 44 (1922–25)
 Sonata No. 3 Epica (Эпическая соната) in E minor for violin and piano, Op. 57 (1935–38)
 Piano Quintet in C major, Op. posth. (1950)

Two pianos 
 March (Марш; Marsch) in C major (1897); unpublished
 2 Pieces, Op. 58 (1940–45)
     Russian Round Dance (Русский хоровод) (1940)
     Knight Errant (Странствующий рыцарь) (1940–45)

Piano 
 Adagio funèbre (Траурное адажио) in E minor (1894–95); unpublished
 8 Mood Pictures (Восемь картин; 8 Stimmungsbilder), Op. 1 (c. 1895–1902)
 3 Fantastic Improvisations (Три фантастические импровизации), Op. 2 (1896–1900)
 3 Pieces (Три пьесы) (1895–96); unpublished
      Pastorale (Пастораль) in C major
      Moment musical (Музыкальный момент; Musikalischer Moment) in C minor
      Humoresque (Юмореска) in F minor
 Prelude (Прелюдия; Präludium) in B minor (1895–1896); unpublished
 6 Preludes (Шесть прелюдий) (1896–97); unpublished
 Prelude (Прелюдия) in E major (1897); unpublished
 Impromptu alla mazurka (Экспромт в духе мазурки) in B minor (1897); unpublished
 Piece (Пьеса) (1897); unpublished
 Sonata in B minor (1897); unpublished
 4 Pieces (Четыре пьесы; 4 Morceaux), Op. 4 (1897–1902)
 Impromptu (Экспромт) in F minor (1898); unpublished
 Sonatina (Сонатина) in G minor (1898); published posthumously in 1981
 Sonata in F minor, Op. 5 (1901–1903)
 Album Leaf (Листок из альбома) (1900); unpublished
 3 Arabesques (Три арабески), Op. 7 (1901–04)
 2 Fairy Tales (Skazki) (Две сказки; 2 Märchen), Op. 8 (1904–05)
 3 Fairy Tales (Skazki) (Три сказки; 3 Märchen), Op. 9 (1904–05)
 3 Dithyrambs (Три дифирамба), Op. 10 (1898–1906)
 Sonaten-Triade (Сонатная Триада), Op. 11 (1904–07)
     Sonata in A major
     Sonata-Elegy (Соната-элегия) in D minor
     Sonata in C major
 2 Fairy Tales (Skazki) (Две сказки; 2 Märchen), Op. 14 (1905–07)
 3 Novellas (Три новеллы), Op. 17 (1908–09)
 2 Fairy Tales (Skazki) (Две сказки; 2 Märchen), Op. 20 (1909)
 Sonata in G minor, Op. 22 (1901–10)
 4 Lyrical Fragments (Четыре лирических фрагмента), Op. 23 (1896–1911)
 2 Cadenzas for Beethoven's Piano Concerto No. 4 (Две каденции к Четвёртому фортепианному концерту Бетховена) (1910)
 2 Sonatas, Op. 25 (1910–11)
     Sonata-Skazka (Sonata-Fairy Tale; Соната-сказка) in C minor
     Sonata Night Wind (Ночной ветер) in E minor
 4 Fairy Tales (Skazki) (Четыре сказки), Op. 26 (1910–12)
 Etude (Этюд) in C minor (1912)
 Etude (Этюд) in E minor (1912?); unpublished
 Sonata-Ballada (Соната-баллада) in F major, Op. 27 (1912–14)
 Sonata in A minor, Op. 30 (1914)
 3 Pieces (Три пьесы), Op. 31 (1914)
 Fairy Tale (Skazka) (Сказка) in D minor (1915)
 Andante con moto in B (1916); unpublished
 4 Fairy Tales (Skazki) (Четыре сказки), Op. 34 (1916–17)
 4 Fairy Tales (Skazki) (Четыре сказки), Op. 35 (1916–17)
 Forgotten Melodies, Cycle I (Забытые мотивы; Vergessene Weisen), Op. 38 (1919–22)
     No. 1 Sonata reminiscenza (Соната-воспоминание) in A minor
 Forgotten Melodies, Cycle II (Забытые мотивы; Vergessene Weisen), Op. 39 (1919–20)
     No. 5 Sonata tragica (Трагическая соната) in C minor
 Forgotten Melodies, Cycle III (Забытые мотивы; Vergessene Weisen), Op. 40 (1919–20)
 3 Fairy Tales (Skazki) (Три сказки), Op. 42 (1921–24)
 Improvisation No. 2 "In the Form of Variations" (Вторая импровизация во форме вариаций), Op. 47 (1925–26)
 2 Fairy Tales (Skazki) (Две сказки; 2 Märchen), Op. 48 (1925)
 3 Hymns of Toil (Три гимна труду; 3 Hymnen an die Arbeit), Op. 49 (1926–28)
 6 Fairy Tales (Skazki) (Шесть сказок), Op. 51 (1928)
 2 Sonatas, Op. 53 (1929–31)
     Sonata romantica (Романтическая соната) in B minor (1929–30)
     Sonata minacciosa (Грозовая соната; Tempest Sonata) in F minor (1929–31)
 2 Easy Piano Pieces (Две лёгких фортепианных пьесы) in B major and A minor (1931?); unpublished
 Romantic Sketches for the Young (Романтические эскизы для юношества; Romantische Skizzen für die Jugend), Op. 54 (1931–32)
 Theme and Variations (Тема с вариациями; Tema con variazioni), Op. 55 (1932–33)
 Sonata-Idyll (Соната-идиллия) in G major, Op. 56 (1935–37)
 2 Elegies (Две элегии), Op. 59 (1940–44)

Vocal 
 Prayer (Молитва) for voice and piano (1896); words by Mikhail Lermontov; unpublished
 The Angel (Ангел) for voice and piano, Op. 1bis (1901–08); words by Mikhail Lermontov; reworking of the Mood Picture, Op. 1 No. 1
 3 Romances (Три романса) for voice and piano, Op. 3 (1903); words by Mikhail Lermontov, Alexander Pushkin and Afanasy Fet after Goethe
 9 Songs after Goethe (Девять песен Гёте; Goethe-Lieder) for voice and piano, Op. 6 (c. 1901–05); words by Johann Wolfgang von Goethe
 3 Poems after Heine (Три стихотворения Гейне) for voice and piano, Op. 12 (1907); words by Heinrich Heine
 2 Songs (Две песни) for voice and piano, Op. 13 (1901–07); words by Alexander Pushkin and Andrei Bely
 12 Songs after Goethe (Двенадцать песен Гёте) for voice and piano, Op. 15 (1905–07); words by Johann Wolfgang von Goethe
 6 Poems after Goethe (Шесть стихотворений Гёте) for voice and piano, Op. 18 (1905–09); words by Johann Wolfgang von Goethe
 3 Poems after Nietzsche (Три стихотворения Ницше) for voice and piano, Op. 19 (1907–09); words by Friedrich Nietzsche
 2 Poems after Nietzsche (Два стихотворения Ницше) for voice and piano, Op. 19a (1910–11); words by Friedrich Nietzsche
 8 Poems after Tyutchev and Fet (Восемь стихотворений Тютчева и Фета) for voice and piano, Op. 24 (1911); words by Fyodor Tyutchev and Afanasy Fet
 7 Poems after Fet, Bryusov and Tyutchev (Семь стихотворений Фета, Брюсова, Тютчева) for voice and piano, Op. 28 (1913); words by Afanasy Fet, Valery Bryusov and Fyodor Tyutchev
 7 Poems after Pushkin (Семь стихотворений Пушкина) for voice and piano, Op. 29 (1913); words by Alexander Pushkin
 6 Poems after Pushkin (Шесть стихотворений Пушкина) for voice and piano, Op. 32 (1915); words by Alexander Pushkin
 6 Poems after Pushkin (Шесть стихотворений Пушкина) for voice and piano, Op. 36 (1918–19); words by Alexander Pushkin
 5 Poems after Tyutchev and Fet (Пять стихотворений Тютчева и Фета) for voice and piano, Op. 37 (1918–20); words by Fyodor Tyutchev and Afanasy Fet
 Sonata-Vocalise (Соната-вокализ) for voice (without words) and piano, Op. 41 No. 1 (1922)
 Suite-Vocalise (Сюита-вокализ) for voice (without words) and piano, Op. 41 No. 2 (1927)
 4 Poems (Четыре стихотворения) for voice and piano, Op. 45 (1922–24); words by Alexander Pushkin and Fyodor Tyutchev
 7 Poems (Семь стихотворений) for voice and piano, Op. 46 (1922–24); words by Johann Wolfgang von Goethe, Joseph Freiherr von Eichendorff and Adelbert von Chamisso
 7 Songs on Poems of Pushkin (Семь песен на стихотворения А. С. Пушкина) for voice and piano, Op. 52 (1928–29); words by Alexander Pushkin
 8 Songs on Russian and German Poems (Восемь песен на стихи русских и немецких поэтов; 7 hinterlassene Lieder) for voice and piano, Op. 61 (1927–51); words by Joseph Freiherr von Eichendorff, Alexander Pushkin, Mikhail Lermontov and Fyodor Tyutchev
     No. 6 Midday (Полдень; Polden) (1936); words by Fyodor Tyutchev; initially published separately as Op. 59 No. 1
 Wie kommt es? for voice and piano (1946–49); words by Hermann Hesse; unpublished

References 

Lists of compositions by composer
Piano compositions by Russian composers
Piano compositions in the 20th century
Lists of piano compositions by composer